Plutonium hydride is a non-stoichiometric chemical compound with the formula PuH2+x. It is one of two characterised hydrides of plutonium, the other is PuH3. PuH2 is non-stoichiometric with a composition range of PuH2 – PuH2.7. Additionally metastable stoichiometries with an excess of hydrogen (PuH2.7 – PuH3) can be formed. PuH2 has a cubic structure. It is readily formed from the elements at 1 atmosphere at 100–200 °C: When the stoichiometry is close to PuH2 it has a silver appearance, but gets blacker as the hydrogen content increases, additionally the color change is associated with a reduction in conductivity.

Pu + H2 → PuH2

Studies of the reaction of plutonium metal with moist air at 200–350 °C showed the presence of cubic plutonium hydride on the surface along with Pu2O3, PuO2 and a higher oxide identified by X-ray diffraction and X-ray photoelectron spectroscopy as the mixed-valence phase PuIV3−xPuVIxO6+x. Investigation of the reaction performed without heating suggests that the reaction of Pu metal and moist air the production of PuO2 and a higher oxide along with adsorbed hydrogen, which catalytically combines with O2 to form water.

Plutonium dihydride on the surface of hydrided plutonium acts as a catalyst for the oxidation of the metal with consumption of both O2 and N2 from air.

See also 
 Uranium hydride bomb

References 

Plutonium compounds
Metal hydrides
Non-stoichiometric compounds